Org 27569 is a drug which acts as a potent and selective negative allosteric modulator of the cannabinoid CB1 receptor. Studies in vitro suggest that it binds to a regulatory site on the CB1 receptor target, causing a conformational change that increases the binding affinity of CB1 agonists such as CP 55,940, while decreasing the binding affinity of CB1 antagonists or inverse agonists such as rimonabant. However while Org 27569 increases the ability of CB1 agonists to bind to the receptor, it decreases their efficacy at stimulating second messenger signalling once bound, and so in practice behaves as an insurmountable antagonist of CB1 receptor function.

See also
 GAT100
 PSNCBAM-1
 ZCZ-011

References 

Cannabinoids
CB1 receptor antagonists